Jang Seong-min (born 22 August 1992) is a South Korean rugby sevens player. He competed in the men's tournament at the 2020 Summer Olympics. He participated in the survival game show Physical : 100 in 2023.

References

External links
 

1992 births
Living people
Male rugby sevens players
Olympic rugby sevens players of South Korea
Rugby sevens players at the 2020 Summer Olympics
Rugby union players at the 2018 Asian Games
Asian Games bronze medalists for South Korea
Asian Games medalists in rugby union
Medalists at the 2018 Asian Games
Korea University alumni
Place of birth missing (living people)